The 1947 New Mexico A&M Aggies football team was an American football team that represented New Mexico College of Agriculture and Mechanical Arts (now known as New Mexico State University) as a member of the Border Conference during the 1947 college football season. In its second and final year under head coach Raymond A. Curfman, the team compiled a 3–6 record and was outscored by a total of 169 to 140. The team played its home games at Quesenberry Field in Las Cruces, New Mexico.

Schedule

References

New Mexico AandM
New Mexico State Aggies football seasons
New Mexico AandM Aggies football